Transport in Korea can refer to:
 Transport in South Korea
 Transport in North Korea